Vernon Cresswell (born 15 September 1958) is a South African cricketer. He played in 46 first-class and 5 List A matches from 1980/81 to 1990/91.

References

External links
 

1958 births
Living people
South African cricketers
Border cricketers
Eastern Province cricketers
Northerns cricketers
Gauteng cricketers
Cricketers from Pretoria